
Year 370 (CCCLXX) was a common year starting on Friday (link will display the full calendar) of the Julian calendar. At the time, it was known as the Year of the Consulship of Augustus and Valens (or, less frequently, year 1123 Ab urbe condita). The denomination 370 for this year has been used since the early medieval period, when the Anno Domini calendar era became the prevalent method in Europe for naming years.

Events 
<onlyinclude>

By place

Roman Empire 
 Germanic Invasions: The German peoples surround the north borders of the Roman Empire, while the Huns are destroying everything in their path--villages, cities, even empires.
 A law of Valentinian I and Valens bans marriages between Romans and barbarians under penalty of death.
 An edict issued by Valentinian I and Valens bans the importation of wine and olive oil from areas controlled by the barbarians.

Europe 
 The Huns migrate westward from the Volga into Europe, and subjugate the Alans and the Ostrogoths. With their arrival, a tradition of composite bows is introduced.
 Athanaric, Gothic leader of the Tervingi, advances eastwards and takes up a defensive position along the banks of the Dniester (Romania).

Asia 
 Former Qin conquers Former Yan in China.

By topic

Religion 
 Basil the Great becomes bishop of Caesarea (Cappadocia).
 Demophilus of Constantinople becomes Patriarch of Constantinople, although his position is disputed by Evagrius of Constantinople.
 John Chrysostom is baptized.

Births 
 Alaric I (or Alaricus), king of the Visigoths (d. 410)
 Brice of Tours, Catholic bishop of Tours (d. 444)
 Claudian, Roman poet and writer (d. 404)
 Decimus Rusticus, Roman praetorian prefect 
 Hypatia, Greek female philosopher (d. 415)

Deaths 
 Deng Xia (or Yingyuan), Chinese general (approximate date)
 Eudoxius of Antioch, Syrian patriarch of Constantinople
 Lucifer Calaritanus, founder of the Luciferian sect (approximate date)
 Pharantzem, Armenian queen and regent (approximate date)
 Strategius Musonianus, Roman politician (approximate date)
 Valentinianus Galates, Roman emperor (approximate date)
 Yuan Zhen (or Yanren), Chinese general and rebel leader

References